Pitcairnia schultzei is a plant species in the genus Pitcairnia. This species is native to Venezuela.

References

schultzei
Flora of Venezuela